Minister of Foreign Affairs of the Hashemite Kingdom of Jordan is a cabinet minister in charge of the Ministry of Foreign Affairs of Jordan, responsible for conducting foreign relations of the country.

List of ministers
The following is a list of foreign ministers of Jordan since 1939:

Emirate of Transjordan (1921–1946)
1939–1944: Tawfik Abu al-Huda
1944–1945: Muhammad ash-Shuraiki
1945–1946: Tawfik Abu al-Huda

Hashemite Kingdom of Jordan (1946–present)
1946–1947: Muhammad ash-Shuraiki
1947: Samir al-Rifai
1947–1949: Fawzi al-Mulki
1949: Ruhi Abdul Hadi
1949–1950: Samir al-Rifai
1950: Muhammad ash-Shuraiki
1950: Ruhi Abdul Hadi
1950–1951: Samir al-Rifai
1951: Ahmad Toukan
1951: Anastas Hanania
1951–1952: Tawfik Abu al-Huda
1952–1953: Fawzi al-Mulki
1953–1954: Husayn al-Khalidi
1954: Jamal Toukan
1954: Tawfik Abu al-Huda
1954–1955: Walid Salah
1955: Sa`id al-Mufti
1955: Hazza` al-Majali
1955–1956: Samir al-Rifai
1956: Husayn al-Khalidi
1956: Samir al-Rifai
1956: Suleiman Nabulsi
1956: Fawzi al-Mulki
1956: Awni Abd al-Hadi
1956–1957: Sulayman al-Nabulsi
1957–1958: Samir al-Rifai
1958–1959: Khulusi al-Khayri
1959: Hazza` al-Majali
1959–1961: Musa Nasir
1961: Bahjat al-Talhouni
1961–1962: Rafi al-Husseini
1962–1963: Hazem Nuseibeh
1963: Amin Husseini 
1963: Sharif Hussein ibn Nasir
1963–1964: Anton Atallah
1964: Amin Husseini 
1964–1965: Kadri Toukan
1965–1966: Hazem Nuseibeh
1966: Akram Zuaiter
1966–1967: Abdullah Salah
1967: Ahmad Toukan
1967: Muhammad Adib al-Amiri
1967–1968: Bahjat al-Talhouni
1968–1969: Abdelmunim al-Rifai
1969: Ahmad Toukan
1969–1970: Abdelmunim al-Rifai
1970: Anton Atallah
1970: Muhammad Daoud
1970–1972: Abdullah Salah
1972–1973: Salah Abu Zaid
1973–1976: Zaid al-Rifai
1976–1979: Mudar Badran
1979–1980: Sharif Abdul Hamid Sharaf
1980–1984: Marwan al-Qasim
1984–1988: Taher al-Masri
1988–1991: Marwan al-Qasim
1991: Taher al-Masri
1991: Abdullah Ensour
1991–1993: Kamel Abu Jaber
1993–1995: Abdul Salam al-Majali
1995–1997: Abdul Karim al-Kabariti
1997–1998: Fayez Tarawneh
1998: Jawad Anani
1998–2002: Abdul Ilah Khatib
2002–2004: Marwan al-Muasher
2004–2005: Hani al-Mulki
2005: Farouq Qasrawi
2005–2007: Abdul Ilah Khatib
2007–2009: Salah Bashir
2009–2017: Nasser Judeh
2017–present: Ayman Safadi

References

Foreign
Foreign Ministers
Politicians